Patrick Houston may refer to:

 Project Pat (Patrick Houston, born 1973), American rapper
 Patrick Houston (captain) (1837–1910), American state senator and military man
 Sir Patrick Houston, 1st Baronet (died 1696)